Landsting elections were held in Denmark on 22 September 1936, with the exceptions that the electors were elected on 15 September and that the candidates elected by the resigning parliament were elected on 14 August.

The election was a victory for the government parties, the Social Democratic Party and Det Radikale Venstre, and for the first time since 1870 did a Danish government have a majority of the seats in both chambers of parliament.

Of the seven constituencies the seats elected by the resigning parliament and the seats representing constituencies number two (Copenhagen County, Frederiksborg County, Holbæk County, Sorø County, Præstø County and Maribo County), number three (Bornholm County), number five (Vejle County, Aarhus County, Skanderborg County, Ringkøbing County, Ribe County, Aabenraa County, Haderslev County, Sønderborg County and Tønder County) and number seven (the Faroe Islands, which was elected by the Løgting).

Results

References

Elections in Denmark
Denmark
1936 elections in Denmark